The forked ferns are the family Gleicheniaceae, which includes six genera and about 160 known species. The formerly independent families Dicranopteridaceae and Stromatopteridaceae are generally included in the Gleicheniaceae, whereas the Dipteridaceae and Matoniaceae, although closely related, are considered separate families by most authors.

Description
These tropical ferns are the most widespread living lineage of Gleicheniales. Their rhizomes have a "vitalized" protostele or in some taxa a solenostele. The leaves are indeterminate, with pseudodichotomously forked leaves except in Stromatopteris, and free veins. The sori are abaxial but not marginal and carry 5–15 exindusiate round sporangia each. These have a transverse-oblique annulus and contain 128 to 800 bilateral or globose-tetrahedral spores. The sori and sporangia mature at the same time, and the spores grow into surface-dwelling green prothalli beset with club-shaped hairs.

Systematics
There is some dispute about ranking these ferns. They are typically placed in the order Gleicheniales. They may alternatively be considered a subclass Gleicheniatae or class Gleichenopsida, so that a distinct taxon can be established for the leptosporangiate ferns. In this case, the Gleicheniaceae are upranked to an order and receive the name Gleicheniales. Irrespective of their modern taxonomic treatment, the Gleicheniaceae were formerly included in the order Polypodiales. But the ferns in the loose sense are much too diverse a group to be shoehorned into one taxon at such a low rank.

The Triassic Antarctipteris and Gleichenipteris are sometimes ascribed to the Gleicheniaceae, but are probably better considered Gleicheniales incertae sedis. There are seven extant genera recognized 

Phylogeny of Gleicheniaceae by Nitta et al. 2022 and Fern Tree of life

Footnotes

References

 A. R. Smith, A. R. Kathleen, M. Pryer, E. Schuettpelz, P. Korall, H. Schneider & P. G. Wolf. 2006. A classification for extant ferns. Taxon 55(3): 705–731. PDF fulltext
 C. Michael Hogan. 2010. Fern. Encyclopedia of Earth. eds. Saikat Basu and C. Cleveland. National Council for Science and the Environment. Washington, D.C.

Gleicheniales
Fern families